Chad Copelin is an American producer, audio engineer, musician, and songwriter from Norman, Oklahoma. Copelin got his start playing in local bands and majoring in music composition and after three years of school, left to collaborate with various musicians, tour nationally, and engineer and produce local bands. In 2005, he opened Blackwatch Studios with co-owner Jarod Evans and produced his first full-length album, I Am Haunted, I Am Alive by Beau Jenning's project Cheyenne. Copelin was nominated at the 2017 Grammy Awards for Best Contemporary Christian Album for his work on "Poets & Saints" by All Sons & Daughters.

Copelin began to garner attention from a diverse mix of musicians and has since gone on to engineer music for pop artists Christina Perri, Avril Lavigne, Train, Kelly Clarkson, and Third Eye Blind, as well as produce and engineer indie artists such as Sufjan Stevens, Ben Rector, Ivan & Alyosha, Bronze Radio Return, Emily Hearn, BRONCHO, and Other Lives, among others. In 2011 Copelin worked on Christina Perri's Top 40 song "A Thousand Years" that went on to receive six platinum records.
Copelin's most recent projects include engineering Sufjan Steven's album, Carrie and Lowell, along with recording and producing Broncho's Just Enough Hip to Be a Woman and Ivan & Alyosha's It's All Just Pretend. Copelin has also been working on new projects with Broncho, Riah, Ben Rector, Bronze Radio Return, Sports and Andrew Belle.

Discography

References

External links
 
 Twitter
 Discography on "Discogs"
 Discography on "Mixbridge''

Record producers from Oklahoma
Living people
Businesspeople from Oklahoma
Musicians from Norman, Oklahoma
Year of birth missing (living people)